Fargo Civic Center is an indoor arena located in Fargo, North Dakota. The  34,000 sq ft center can hold approximately 3,000 people during concerts and 1,500 people during basketball games.
It also hosts trade shows, sporting events, entertainment events, meetings and community events.

References

External links
Fargo Civic Center website

Sports venues in North Dakota
Buildings and structures in Fargo, North Dakota
Tourist attractions in Fargo, North Dakota
Basketball venues in North Dakota